This is a list of towns and villages in the Commonwealth of Dominica. The following definitions have been used:
City: Any settlement listed at  that had a 2009 population estimate of 75,000 or more. There are no cities in Dominica.
Town: As given at  plus any other settlements with a 2009 population estimate of between 750 and 75,000.
Neighbourhood: Geographically obvious subdivisions of any of the above.

Towns

Atkinson
Barroui (Salisbury)
Calibishie
Canefield
Castle Bruce
Grand Bay (Berekua)
La Plaine
Mahaut
Marigot
Pointe Michel
Portsmouth (Grand-Anse)
Rosalie
Roseau (Capital)
Saint Joseph
Salisbury (Barroui)
Soufrière
Wesley (La Soie)
Woodford Hill

Villages

Anse du Mé
Bagatelle
Bataka
Belles
Bellevue Chopin
Bense
Bioche
Boetica
Bornes
Campbell
Capucin
Clifton
Colihaut
Cottage
Coulibistrie
Delices
Dublanc
Dubuc
Eggleston
Fond Cani
Fond St. Jean
Galion
Giraudel
Good Hope
Goodwill
Grandbay
Grand Fond
Laudat
Layou
Loubiere
Massacre
Mahaut
Mero
Morne Daniel
Morne Prosper
Paix Bouche
Penville
Petite Savanne
Petite Soufriere
Pichelin
San Sauveur
Salybia
Scotts Head
Stockfarm
Stowe
Tanetane
Tarou
Thibaud
Toucari
Trafalgar
Vieille Case
Warner
Wotten Waven

References

 
Lists of towns